Hamilton County is a county located in the U.S. state of Iowa. As of the 2020 census, the population was 15,039.  The county seat is Webster City. The county was named to honor William W. Hamilton, a President of the Iowa State Senate.

Geography
The largest body of water is Little Wall Lake.

Major highways
 Interstate 35
 U.S. Highway 20
 U.S. Highway 69
 Iowa Highway 17
 Iowa Highway 175

Transit
 List of intercity bus stops in Iowa

Adjacent counties
Wright County  (north)
Hardin County  (east)
Story County  (southeast)
Boone County  (southwest)
Webster County  (west)

Demographics

2020 census
There were 7,037 housing units, of which 6,283 were occupied.

2010 census
There were 7,219 housing units, of which 6,540 were occupied.

2000 census

As of the census of 2000, there were 16,438 people, 6,692 households, and 4,597 families residing in the county. The population density was 28 people per square mile (11/km2). There were 7,082 housing units at an average density of 12 per square mile (5/km2). The racial makeup of the county was 96.71% White, 0.23% Black or African American, 0.20% Native American, 1.46% Asian, 0.01% Pacific Islander, 0.61% from other races, and 0.78% from two or more races. 1.42% of the population were Hispanic or Latino of any race.

There were 6,692 households, out of which 30.60% had children under the age of 18 living with them, 57.90% were married couples living together, 7.60% had a female householder with no husband present, and 31.30% were non-families. 27.50% of all households were made up of individuals, and 13.60% had someone living alone who was 65 years of age or older. The average household size was 2.43 and the average family size was 2.95.

In the county, the population was spread out, with 25.40% under the age of 18, 7.10% from 18 to 24, 27.10% from 25 to 44, 22.40% from 45 to 64, and 18.00% who were 65 years of age or older. The median age was 39 years. For every 100 females there were 98.00 males. For every 100 females age 18 and over, there were 94.80 males.

The median income for a household in the county was $38,658, and the median income for a family was $45,771. Males had a median income of $30,579 versus $23,595 for females. The per capita income for the county was $18,801. About 4.30% of families and 6.30% of the population were below the poverty line, including 7.70% of those under age 18 and 5.50% of those age 65 or over.

Communities

Cities

Blairsburg
Ellsworth
Jewell Junction
Kamrar
Randall
Stanhope
Stratford
Webster City
Williams

Unincorporated communities
 Homer

Townships

 Blairsburg
Fremont
Cass
Williams
Freedom
Independence
Rose Grove
Webster
Hamilton
Lyon
Lincoln
Marion
Clear Lake
Ellsworth
Scott
Liberty

Population ranking
The population ranking of the following table is based on the 2020 census of Hamilton County.

† county seat

Politics
Hamilton County has been a swing county for most of its history. In the last 100 years, it has backed the losing candidate nationally only four times in the 1960, 1988, 2012 and 2020 presidential elections.

Education
School districts include:
 Hubbard-Radcliffe Community School District
 Roland-Story Community School District
 South Hamilton Community School District
 Stratford Community School District
 Webster City Community School District

Former school districts:
 Northeast Hamilton Community School District

See also

National Register of Historic Places listings in Hamilton County, Iowa

References

External links

Hamilton County, Iowa Portal style website, Government, Recreation and more

 
1856 establishments in Iowa
Populated places established in 1856